An air officer is an air force officer of the rank of air commodore or higher. Such officers may be termed "officers of air rank". While the term originated in the Royal Air Force, air officers are also to be found in many Commonwealth nations who have a similar rank structure to the RAF.

Air officers holding command appointments receive the title Air Officer Commanding (AOC), whereas air officers holding commander-in-chief positions are titled as Air Officer Commanding-in-Chief (AOC-in-C).

British usage
In the British Armed Forces, where the term originated, an air officer is equivalent in concept to flag officer and general officer in the Royal Navy and Army respectively.  Specifically, while the Army uses General Officer Commanding (GOC), the Air Force uses Air Officer Commanding (AOC) to designate the senior officer in a formation.

Note, however, that in the British Armed Forces, while an air commodore is an air officer, his Royal Navy equivalent (commodore) is not considered a flag officer, nor is the British Army or Royal Marines equivalent (brigadier) considered a general officer. In 1919 when the RAF introduced its own air officer ranks, the preceding RAF and equivalent army rank was brigadier-general, which was a general officer rank until its abolition in 1922. In some other countries — most notably the armed forces of the United States — Army, Air Force and Marine Corps one-star officers are considered to be general officers, and one-star officers of the Navy and Coast Guard are considered to be flag officers.

There are multiple air officer command appointments. Additionally the RAF maintains two home country air officer appointments. These are Air Officer Scotland and the Air Officer for Wales.

On ceremonial occasions, many RAF air officers are entitled to wear embellished shoulder boards and the gold and blue sash. This applies to all officers at or above the rank of air vice-marshal and holders of the following air commodore posts:

Commandant of the Royal Air Force College Cranwell
Air Officer Scotland 
Air Officer Northern Ireland
Air Officer Wales

With the exception of marshals of the RAF, the embellished shoulder boards feature the golden air officers' eagle and wreath device surmounted by a lion statant guardant. For marshals of the RAF, the embellished shoulder boards display the air officer's eagle and wreath, two crossed marshal's batons and, since the coronation of Queen Elizabeth II, the St Edward's Crown representing royal authority. Prior to 1953, the Tudor Crown (sometimes called the King's Crown) was used.

Air officer ranks
The air officer ranks are as follows:

National usage
The air officer terminology is currently used by the following air forces:

Bangladesh Air Force
Indian Air Force
Namibian Air Force
Nigerian Air Force
Pakistan Air Force
Sri Lanka Air Force
Royal Air Force
Royal Australian Air Force
Royal New Zealand Air Force
Air Force of Zimbabwe

References

Military ranks of the Commonwealth
Royal Air Force
Air force personnel